The Movie Album: As Time Goes By is a 1998 album by Neil Diamond, conducted by Elmer Bernstein. It peaked at number 31 on the Billboard 200 chart.

Track listing

Production 
 Bob Gaudio – producer 
 Sam Cole – production coordinator 
 Alan Lindgren – music coordinator
 Bill Schnee – recording, mixing 
 Bernie Becker – engineer
 John Rodd – orchestra recording 
 John Rotondi – orchestra stage engineer 
 Koji Egawa – assistant engineer 
 Doug Sax – mastering 
 Gabrielle Raumberger – art direction, design 
 Clifford Singontiko – design
 Rocky Schenck – photography 
 Neal Preston – recording studio photography

Studios 
 Recorded at Record Plant and Arch Angel Studios (Los Angeles, California).
 Mixed at Bill Schnee Studios (North Hollywood, California).
 Mastered at The Mastering Lab (Hollywood, California).

References 

1998 albums
Neil Diamond albums
Albums produced by Bob Gaudio
Columbia Records albums
Covers albums
Traditional pop albums